Carex hystericina is a species of sedge known by the common names bottlebrush sedge and porcupine sedge. It is native to much of North America including most of southern Canada and most of the United States. It grows in wet habitat such as wetlands and riverbanks, especially on calcareous soils. In the right conditions it can become very abundant and even weedy. This sedge produces dense or loose clumps of triangular stems up to a meter tall from short rhizomes. The inflorescence is several centimeters long and is accompanied by a bract which is longer than the spikes. The fruits are coated in perigynia with pointed, toothed tips. It is highly recommend for sedge meadow restorations.

External links
Jepson Manual Treatment
USDA Plants Profile
Flora of North America

hystericina
Plants described in 1805
Taxa named by Gotthilf Heinrich Ernst Muhlenberg